The Niagara Falls Bridge Commission is an international public agency which administers three international bridges across the Niagara River connecting the province of Ontario, Canada and the state of New York, United States: the Lewiston–Queenston Bridge, Whirlpool Rapids Bridge and Rainbow Bridge. The NFBC is incorporated as a class D New York State public benefit corporation and is licensed to operate in Ontario under the Extra-Provincial Corporations Act. The commission is based in Lewiston, New York and maintains a post office box address in Niagara Falls, Ontario. It is mostly self-supporting from tolls, leases, and commercial concessions.

Board of Commissioners
Canada and the U.S. are equally represented through the bi-national appointment of an eight-member Board of Commissioners; four appointed by the Premier of Ontario and four by the Governor of New York.

See also
 Buffalo and Fort Erie Public Bridge Authority - public, Peace Bridge
  International Bridge Company - private, Ambassador Bridge
 Ogdensburg Bridge and Port Authority - public
 Port Authority of New York and New Jersey - public
 Sault Ste. Marie Bridge Company - private, railway bridge
 Thousand Islands Bridge Authority - public, Thousand Islands Bridge
 Windsor-Detroit Bridge Authority - public, Gordie Howe International Bridge

References

External links

1938 establishments in New York (state)
Canada–United States border
Public benefit corporations in New York (state)
Transport in the Regional Municipality of Niagara
Transportation in Niagara County, New York